Moorehead (Irish (eastern Ulster): variant of Muirhead) is a surname. Notable people with the surname include:

 Aaron Moorehead (born 1980), American football player
 Agnes Moorehead, (born 1900), American actress
 Alan Moorehead, Australian writer and journalist
 Emery Moorehead, (born 1954), former American football player
 Monica Moorehead, (born 1952), American politician

See also
 Moorhead (disambiguation)
 Morehead (disambiguation)

Surnames of Northern Ireland origin